Revolutionary Committee for Unity and Action (in French: Comité Révolutionnaire d'Unité et d'Action) was a militant group in Algeria formed in order to fight French rule. CRUA regrouped former elements of the OS and radical members of the MTLD. The CRUA was founded by 33 persons.

CRUA would later evolve into the FLN and produce the Declaration of 1 November 1954 written by the journalist Mohamed Aïchaoui.

Group of 22

Mohamed Belouizdad 
Mostefa Ben Boulaïd 
Mohamed Larbi Ben M'Hidi 
Benmostefa Benaouda 
Lakhdar Bentobal 
Rabah Bitat 
Zoubir Bouadjadj 
Said Bouali 
Ahmed Bouchaïb 
Mohamed Boudiaf 
Abdelhafid Boussouf 
Lyès Deriche 
Mourad Didouche 
Abdessalam Habachi 
Abdelkader Lamoudi
Mohamed Mechati 
Slimane Mellah 
Mohamed Merzoughi 
Badji Mokhtar 
Abdelmalek Ramdane
Boudjemaa Souidani 
Youcef Zighoud

See also
 Declaration of 1 November 1954

References
Tlemcani, Rachid, State and Revolution in Algeria. Boulder: Westview Press, 1986.

Arab militant groups
French Algeria
National Liberation Front (Algeria)
Rebel groups in Algeria